Phyllis Kai Yi Chan (born July 18, 1991) is a Canadian  badminton player from Vancouver, British Columbia. She has been one of the top ranked women's individual and doubles player on the continent and a contender in major international competitions. She is a national champion in women's doubles with Alex Bruce, and has won several international titles since 2010. She also got married on September 17, 2019.

References

External links
 Badminton Canada profile PDF 
 http://olympique.ca/team-canada/phyllis-chan/

1987 births
Living people
Badminton players at the 2014 Commonwealth Games
Badminton players at the 2015 Pan American Games
Canadian female badminton players
Commonwealth Games competitors for Canada
Pan American Games bronze medalists for Canada
Sportspeople from Vancouver
Pan American Games medalists in badminton
Medalists at the 2015 Pan American Games